Hammersmith is a parliamentary constituency in the House of Commons of the UK Parliament. It is currently represented by Andy Slaughter, a member of the Labour Party, who has represented the seat since its recreation in 2010.

For the purposes of election expenses and type of returning officer, it is considered a borough constituency, and as with all constituencies, elects one Member of Parliament using the first-past-the-post system.

Boundaries

1885–1918 
1885–1918: The parishes of St Peter and St Paul, Hammersmith.

The parliamentary borough of Hammersmith was created by the Redistribution of Seats Act 1885 and consisted of the civil parish of Hammersmith (in Middlesex only until 1889 when it fell within the approximately  that became part of the County of London under the Local Government Act 1888). Like almost all seats created from 1885 it returned one Member of Parliament. This was the first parliamentary constituency to be based on the town, which from 1868 to 1885 was at the westernmost part of Chelsea and previously had been part of the parliamentary county of Middlesex. In 1900 the Metropolitan Borough of Hammersmith was formed, but this did not affect the constituency's boundaries.

The seat bordered to the west the Ealing seat, to the north the large Harrow division of Middlesex seat, to the east Kensington North and Kensington South and to the south the large Kingston division of Surrey and, to the southeast, Fulham. In 1918 the Hammersmith constituency was divided into Hammersmith North and Hammersmith South constituencies.

1983–1997 
The second parliamentary borough constituency of Hammersmith was created in 1983. By then the area was part of Greater London and the London Borough of Hammersmith and Fulham (both created in 1965). The constituency consisted of ten wards of the London borough, namely Addison, Broadway, Brook Green, College Park and Old Oak, Coningham, Grove, Ravenscourt, Starch Green, White City and Shepherds Bush, and Wormholt. The seat was entirely formed from the previous Hammersmith North constituency.

BBC Television Centre, Shepherd's Bush Market and the Hammersmith Apollo was in this version of the constituency for its 14-year existence, however Westfield London shopping centre had not yet been built.

The constituency was abolished in 1997 and mostly replaced by Hammersmith and Fulham.  A northern slice of the seat became part of Ealing, Acton and Shepherd's Bush. The new Hammersmith and Fulham constituency included the town centres of both Hammersmith and Fulham.

2010–present 
Following a review of parliamentary boundaries in North London, the Boundary Commission for England recreated the Hammersmith constituency for the 2010 general election, following major changes in the London Borough of Hammersmith and Fulham. The review also created new seats of Chelsea and Fulham and Kensington.

The current Hammersmith constituency is made up of the following ten electoral wards of the London Borough of Hammersmith and Fulham: Addison, Askew, Avonmore and Brook Green, College Park and Old Oak, Fulham Reach, Hammersmith Broadway, North End, Ravenscourt Park, Shepherds Bush Green, and Wormholt and White City.

The 2005 notional result was Labour 44.6%, Conservative 31.1% and Liberal Democrat 19.2%.

Constituency profile 
The constituency includes the western part of the London Borough of Hammersmith and Fulham, stretching from Wormwood Scrubs down to the River Thames. It takes in the commercial and business hub of Hammersmith itself, parts of northwestern Fulham, the western part of Earl's Court (the Exhibition Centre itself straddles the boundary between this constituency and the Kensington seat), West Kensington, Shepherd's Bush, and White City. The seat has northern areas with a much higher proportion of social housing dependency than the London average and overall this leads to the seat having slightly higher rates of unemployment and underemployment.
Political history since 2010
The Labour Party candidate took a marginal majority of 7.5% of the vote in 2010.  Slaughter's majority in 2015, 13.6%, made it the 156th safest of the party's 232 seats by percentage of majority.
In 2017, Slaughter increased his majority to 35.7%.  In 2019, Slaughter's majority slipped slightly to 34.4%

Members of Parliament

Election results

Elections in the 2010s 

* Served as an MP in the 2005–2010 Parliament for the seat of Ealing, Acton and Shepherd's Bush

Election results 1983–1992

Both Starks and Knott were official candidates of their respective local parties and both supported the Alliance between the Liberals and the SDP, however Starks was given endorsement by both the national parties.

Election Results 1885–1918

Elections in the 1910s

Elections in the 1900s

Elections in the 1890s

Elections in the 1880s

See also
 List of parliamentary constituencies in London
Hammersmith and Fulham

Notes

References

External links 
Politics Resources (Election results from 1922 onwards)
Electoral Calculus (Election results from 1955 onwards)
 British Parliamentary Election Results 1885–1918, compiled and edited by F.W.S. Craig (Macmillan Press 1974)
 Debrett’s Illustrated Heraldic and Biographical House of Commons and the Judicial Bench 1886
 Debrett’s House of Commons and the Judicial Bench 1901
 Debrett’s House of Commons and the Judicial Bench 1918
 Boundaries of Parliamentary Constituencies 1885–1972, compiled and edited by F.W.S. Craig (Parliamentary Reference Publications 1972)
 British Parliamentary Constituencies: A Statistical Compendium, by Ivor Crewe and Anthony Fox (Faber and Faber 1984)

Politics of the London Borough of Hammersmith and Fulham
Constituencies of the Parliament of the United Kingdom established in 1885
Constituencies of the Parliament of the United Kingdom disestablished in 1918
Constituencies of the Parliament of the United Kingdom established in 1983
Constituencies of the Parliament of the United Kingdom disestablished in 1997
Constituencies of the Parliament of the United Kingdom established in 2010
Parliamentary constituencies in London
Hammersmith